Lancaster House Conferences may refer to any of the following meetings that took place at Lancaster House in London:

The Lancaster House Conferences (Nigeria) in 1957 and 1958 where the federal constitution for an independent Nigeria was prepared
The Lancaster House Conferences (Kenya), three meetings (1960, 1962, 1963) in which Kenya's constitutional framework and independence were negotiated
The Ugandan Constitutional Conference, held at Lancaster House in September and October 1961
A Conference that led to the Lancaster House Agreement, the independence agreement for Rhodesia, now known as Zimbabwe

See also 
 The Lancaster House Treaties, an Anglo-French military co-operation agreement signed in 2010